Joshua Umerah (born 8 March 1997) is an English professional footballer who plays as a forward for League Two club Hartlepool United.

Umerah began his career with Charlton Athletic, making his debut in 2016, and spent time on loan at Scottish club Kilmarnock, Wycombe Wanderers, Boreham Wood. He left Charlton in 2019, spending a season each at National League clubs Ebbsfleet United, Torquay United, and Wealdstone, before returning to the Football League with Hartlepool United in 2022.

Career

Charlton Athletic
Umerah came through the Charlton Athletic academy, and helped the under-18 side to win the Professional Development League 2 after finishing as top-scorer during the 2014–15 season. He made his first team debut as a 66th-minute substitute for Igor Vetokele in a 6–0 defeat to Hull City in a Championship match at the KCOM Stadium on 16 January 2016. He signed an extended contract with the club in April 2016, to keep him at the club until June 2018.

Kilmarnock, Wycombe Wanderers, and Boreham Wood loans
Umerah moved on loan to Kilmarnock in January 2017. Umerah joined Wycombe Wanderers on 29 August 2017, for an initial loan running until January 2018, wearing the number 26 shirt for his time at Adams Park.

On 8 August 2018, Umerah signed on loan for Boreham Wood for the entire 2018–19 season.

Ebbsfleet and Torquay
On 23 July 2019, Umerah signed for Ebbsfleet United.

On 9 September 2020, Umerah signed for Torquay United. On the 23 June 2021, he was released by the club.

Wealdstone
On 6 July 2021 Umerah signed for Wealdstone. On 21 August 2021, Umerah scored on his Wealdstone debut in a 2–1 defeat to Woking. He would go on to score 5 times in his first 7 appearances for the Stones, including a brace away at Notts County. On 12 February 2022, Umerah scored Wealdstone's second in an eventual 3–1 win against local rivals Barnet, taking his tally up to 10 for the season. He scored a total of 17 goals for Wealdstone.

Hartlepool United
On 14 July 2022 League Two side Hartlepool United announced the signing of Umerah from Wealdstone for an undisclosed fee. He was reported to have signed a two year deal with the League Two club. On 13 August, Umerah scored his first Hartlepool goal in a 2–1 defeat to Northampton Town. As a second half substitute, Umerah scored a brace in a 2–2 draw at Mansfield Town as Hartlepool came from 2–0 down. On 26 November, Umerah reached double digits for the season with a brace in a 3–1 win against Harrogate Town in a second round FA Cup fixture. Umerah won the League Two PFA fans' player of the month for January 2023.

Career statistics

References

1998 births
Living people
Footballers from Catford
English footballers
English people of Nigerian descent
Black British sportspeople
Association football forwards
Charlton Athletic F.C. players
English Football League players
Kilmarnock F.C. players
Wycombe Wanderers F.C. players
Boreham Wood F.C. players
Ebbsfleet United F.C. players
Torquay United F.C. players
Wealdstone F.C. players
Hartlepool United F.C. players
Scottish Professional Football League players
National League (English football) players